Campbell Brook is a river in Otsego County, New York. It flows into Unadilla River south of Unadilla Forks and southwest of Mount Markham.

References

Rivers of New York (state)
Rivers of Otsego County, New York